Masterplan is the first studio album by the Swiss singer Stefanie Heinzmann. It was released by Universal Music Domestic on 7 March 2008 in German-speaking Europe, after she won the television talent contest SSDSDSSWEMUGABRTLAD on the television show TV total. The album was mainly produced by Paul NZA and Marek Pompetzki. On 14 November 2008 a deluxe edition of the album was released, including the previously unreleased single "The Unforgiven" by Metallica, a cover version of Stevie Wonder's "Superstition", a B-side and two remix versions.

Background
In mid–2007, her brother convinced Heinzmann to take part in Stefan Raab's talent contest SSDSDSSWEMUGABRTLAD, organised by commercial television channel ProSieben. She was picked as one of the 20 contestants for the show, and with her interpretations of soul, jazz and funk classics by the likes of Macy Gray, Norah Jones and Joss Stone, she managed to qualify for the final show on 10 January 2008. There, Heinzmann performed two songs, "Only So Much Oil in the Ground," a Tower of Power cover, and "My Man Is a Mean Man," which was specifically selected for her. Through televoting, the audience chose Heinzmann as the winner of the show, beating the two remaining contestants, Steffi List and Gregor Meyle.

Chart performance
Masterplan debuted at number-one on the Swiss Albums Chart. It remained seven weeks within the top ten and spent forty weeks on the chart. In Switzerland, the album was certified platinum by the International Federation of the Phonographic Industry (IFPI) for more than 30,000 copies sold and was ranked 17th on the Swiss year-end chart. In Germany, the album debuted and peaked at number three on the German Albums Chart It was eventually certified platinum in Germany by the Bundesverband Musikindustrie (BVMI) as well, for shipping 200,000 copies. In Austria, Masterplan reached the top five of the Austrian Albums Chart.

Track listing

Notes
 denotes co-producer

Credits and personnel

 Chris Bruce – bass guitar
 Earl Harvin – cymbal, drums
 Vanessa Mason – backing vocals
 Paul NZA – various instruments
 Marek Pompetzki – various instruments
 Kim Sanders – backing vocals
 Sebastian Studnitzky – brass
 Tobias Thiele – guitar

Production

 Paul NZA – engineering
 Marek Pompetzki – engineering, mixing
 Reinsberg.de – artwork
 Michael Zargarinejad – photography

Charts

Weekly charts

Year-end charts

Certifications

Release history

References

External links
  
 

2008 debut albums
Stefanie Heinzmann albums
Polydor Records albums